Sara is an American sitcom television series that aired on NBC from January 23 to May 8, 1985. Starring Geena Davis in the title role, the series features early performances from several actors who went on to greater acclaim, including Alfre Woodard, Bronson Pinchot and Bill Maher. Sara was set in a San Francisco Legal Aid office and featured one of the earliest regular gay characters on an American television series (Dennis Kemper, played by Pinchot).

Cast
 Geena Davis as Sara McKenna
 Alfre Woodard as Rozalyn Dupree
 Bill Maher as Marty Lang
 Mark Hudson as Stuart Webber
 Bronson Pinchot as Dennis Kemper
 Ronnie Claire Edwards as Helen Newcomb
 Matthew Lawrence as Jesse Webber

Episodes

Reception
Because it was scheduled opposite Dynasty, which was then the most popular series on the air. Sara failed to attract an audience and was cancelled after 13 episodes, although NBC did re-air the series in 1988. According to TVTango.com's ratings database, Sara ranked 48th out of 104 programs that aired during the 1984–85 season, with an average household rating of 14.44.

Notes

References
 Capsuto, Steven (2000). Alternate Channels: The Uncensored Story of Gay and Lesbian Images on Radio and Television. Ballantine Books. .

External links
 

1985 American television series debuts
1985 American television series endings
1980s American LGBT-related comedy television series
1980s American sitcoms
1980s American legal television series
English-language television shows
NBC original programming
Television shows set in San Francisco
Television series by Universal Television
Television series created by Gary David Goldberg
American LGBT-related sitcoms
1980s LGBT-related sitcoms